Didier Plaschy (born 2 May 1973) is a Swiss former alpine skier who competed in the 1998 Winter Olympics.

External links
 sports-reference.com

1973 births
Living people
Swiss male alpine skiers
Olympic alpine skiers of Switzerland
Alpine skiers at the 1998 Winter Olympics
Universiade medalists in alpine skiing
Universiade gold medalists for Switzerland
Competitors at the 1993 Winter Universiade
20th-century Swiss people